The 2007 Delray Beach International Tennis Championships was a men's professional tennis event on the 2007 ATP Tour in Delray Beach, Florida, United States, held from January 27 to February 4.  Xavier Malisse won the title, an ATP International Series level tournament. Xavier Malisse won the singles title.

This was the third tournament of the season (alongside Adelaide, Viña del Mar, Buenos Aires and Las Vegas) that implemented a 24-player Round robin tournament for the singles competition, as part of the round-robin trials proposed during this season.

Singles main-draw entrants

Seeds 

 Rankings are as of January 22, 2007.

Other entrants 
The following players received wildcards into the main draw:
  Jan-Michael Gambill
  Michael Russell
  Ryan Sweeting

The following players received entry from the qualifying draw:
  Scoville Jenkins
  Jesse Levine
  Sergiy Stakhovsky
  Dušan Vemić

Doubles main-draw entrants

Seeds 

1 Rankings are as of January 22, 2007.

Other entrants 
The following pairs received wildcards into the main draw:
  Konstantinos Economidis /  Teymuraz Gabashvili
  Jan-Michael Gambill /  Rainer Schüttler

Finals

Singles

 Xavier Malisse defeated  James Blake, 5–7, 6–4, 6–4
 It was Malisse's 2nd title of the year and the 3rd and final title on his career.

Doubles

 Hugo Armando /  Xavier Malisse defeated  James Auckland /  Stephen Huss, 6–3, 6–7(4–7), [10–5]
 It was the only title of his career for Armando, and the 2nd title of the year and the 4th of his career for Malisse.

References

External links
 ITF tournament edition details
 Singles draw
 Doubles draw